The Ukrainian (Greek) Catholic Eparchy of Wrocław–Koszalin (Wrocław–Koszalin of the Ukrainians) is a suffragan eparchy (Eastern Catholic diocese) in the ecclesiastical province of the Metropolitan Archeparchy of Przemyśl–Warsawa, which covers some part of Poland for the Ukrainian Greek Catholic Church (Byzantine rite in Ukrainian language) parallel to the Latin hierarchy. It depends from the Roman Congregation for the Oriental Churches.

Its episcopal see is the St Vincent and St James Cathedral, in Wrocław (Breslau, western Poland), in the administrative Lower Silesian Voivodeship (Dolnośląskie province).

Statistics 
As per 2015, it pastorally served 25,000 Catholics in 56 parishes with 33 priests (32 diocesan, 1 religious), 10 lay religious (1 brother, 9 sisters) and 2 seminarians.

History
24 May 1996: the Eparchy was established as Eparchy of Wrocław–Gdańsk from the Ukrainian Catholic Archeparchy of Przemyśl–Warsaw.
25 November 2020: Changed name from Eparchy of Wrocław–Gdańsk to Eparchy of Wrocław–Koszalin
25 November 2020: Lost territory along with the Ukrainian Catholic Archeparchy of Przemyśl–Warsaw to establish the new Ukrainian Catholic Eparchy of Olsztyn–Gdańsk

Eparchial bishops

''Eparchs of Wrocław–Gdańsk 
 Teodor Majkowicz (12 July 1997 – death 9 May 1998)
 Administrator Fr. Petro Kryk (1998 – 1999)
 Wlodzimierz Roman Juszczak, O.S.B.M. (24 April 1999 – ...)

See also 
 Ukrainian Greek Catholic Church
 List of Catholic dioceses in Poland

Sources and external links 
  Official website (in Polish)
 GCatholic.org with Google map and - satellite photo, data for all sections

Eparchies of the Ukrainian Greek Catholic Church in Poland
Eastern Catholicism in Poland
Religious organizations established in 1996
Christianity in Wrocław